{{DISPLAYTITLE:C22H32O2}}
The molecular formula C22H32O2 may refer to the following organic compounds:

 Allyltestosterone
 Docosahexaenoic acid
 Grifolin
 17α-Methylprogesterone
 Parahexyl
 Promestriene
 Retinyl acetate
 Tetrahydrocannabihexol